Italia-Germania 4-3 is a 1990 Italian comedy film directed by Andrea Barzini. The title is inspired by the semi-finals of the 1970 FIFA World Cup.

Cast 
Massimo Ghini as Federico
Giuseppe Cederna as  Antonio
Fabrizio Bentivoglio as  Francesco
Nancy Brilli as  Giulia
Emanuela Pacotto as  Martina

References

External links

1990 films
1990 comedy films
Italian comedy films
1990s Italian films